North Carolina is a state in the Southeastern region of the United States.

North Carolina may also refer to:

Places
 Province of North Carolina, a British colony from 1729 to 1776

Educational institutions
 University of North Carolina, the public university system of the state of North Carolina, of which the Chapel Hill campus is the oldest
 University of North Carolina at Chapel Hill, often referred to (technically inaccurately) as the "University of North Carolina"

Ships
 CSS North Carolina, an ironclad gunboat built by the Confederate States Navy in 1863
 USS North Carolina, the name of five ships of the United States Navy
 In the Antebellum period, the North Carolina was the lead ship of slave trader Zephaniah Kingsley.

Sport
 North Carolina Tar Heels, the athletic program of the University of North Carolina at Chapel Hill

See also
 
 
 Carolina (disambiguation)